James Wallace (1729–1783), of Carleton Hall, Cumbria, was an English barrister, Member of Parliament, Solicitor General and Attorney General.

Life
The son of Thomas Wallace, of Asholme, Northumberland, attorney-at-law, Wallace entered Lincoln's Inn and was called to the Bar in 1757. In 1770, he was elected as one of the Members of Parliament for Horsham in Sussex. In 1778, he was appointed Solicitor General for England and Wales and in 1780 Attorney General. 

He died in 1783 and was buried in Exeter Cathedral. On 8 January 1767 Wallace had married Elizabeth, only daughter and sole heiress of Thomas Simpson, Esquire, of Carleton Hall, Cumberland, and they had two children, his son and heir Thomas Wallace, 1st Baron Wallace who married Jean Hope, and Elizabeth (1770–1792) who died unmarried.

References

1729 births
1783 deaths
People from Northumberland
Members of Lincoln's Inn
Members of the Parliament of Great Britain for English constituencies
British MPs 1768–1774
British MPs 1774–1780
Attorneys General for England and Wales
Solicitors General for England and Wales